Roberto Eslava Suárez (born 22 January 1988) is a Spanish professional footballer who plays as a centre-back.

Club career
Born in Telde, Eslava made his senior debut in the 2007–08 season with UD Telde in Tercera Division. He spent the following two seasons with UD Las Palmas Atlético and Universidad de Las Palmas CF in Segunda División B, before returning to the fourth tier in 2011 with CD Marino.

In 2012, Eslava joined Atlético Granadilla also in the fourth division. Although his team managed to reach the promotion play-offs, but was eliminated after losing to Gimnástica Segoviana.

After a stint back at Marino, Eslava signed for UD San Fernando on 25 July 2015. On 2 October 2017, he moved to fellow league club Unionistas de Salamanca CF, and helped the side achieve promotion to the third level.

On 2 May 2018, Eslava moved abroad and joined Indian I-League club Chennai City FC. He made his professional debut on 26 October, starting in a 4–1 home routing of Indian Arrows. In that season, he helped the team winning the league.

On 8 July 2020, Eslava returned to Spain and its third division, after agreeing to a contract with CD Izarra. In January 2022, Eslava moved to CD Mensajero. He left the club at the end of the 2021-22 season.

Honours

Club
Chennai City FC
I-League: 2018–19

References

External links

1988 births
Living people
Spanish footballers
Spanish expatriate footballers
People from Telde
Sportspeople from the Province of Las Palmas
Association football defenders
Segunda División B players
Tercera División players
UD Las Palmas Atlético players
Universidad de Las Palmas CF footballers
CD Marino players
Unionistas de Salamanca CF players
CD Izarra footballers
I-League players
Chennai City FC players
CD Mensajero players
Expatriate footballers in India
Spanish expatriate sportspeople in India